Margot Rojas Mendoza (24 March 1903 – 1 November 1996) was a Cuban pianist and teacher of Cuban-Mexican origin. She performed as a concert pianist in New York, Mexico and Cuba for several years before turning to teaching. Several of her pupils became distinguished musicians.

Early years

Margot Rojas was born in Veracruz, Mexico on 24 March 1903. Her mother was Cuban and her father Mexican. She started her musical studies at the age of five under her aunt, Consuelo Mendoza. In 1912 she moved with her family to Havana, where she continued her studies at the Hubert de Blanck Conservatory. She was taught theory by José Molina Torres and Rafaela Serrano, and was taught piano by Consuelo Quesada and Hubert de Blanck. In Cuba in 1913 the public performances of Ernesto Lecuona and Dulce María Serret made a great impression on her. She graduated from Hubert de Blanck's piano classes in 1916.

Performer

In 1919 Margot went to New York City and studied under Alexander Lambert, who had himself studied under Franz Liszt in Weimar. She accompanied the violinist Joseph Joachim, and performed at the Steinway Hall. On her way back to Cuba she performed in Mexico City at the Sala Wagner  and the Palacio de Bellas Artes. At the start of the 1920s Margot launched in a career as a concert player in Cuba, giving recitals in Santiago de Cuba and Camagüey. Margot Rojas first performed in public in Cuba in 1920 with a recital in the Sala Espadero of the Hubert de Blanck Conservatory. She played on 20 October 1923 at the Teatro Nacional de Cuba. On 30 November 1924 she performed Frédéric Chopin's Piano Concerto No. 1 as first soloist with the Havana Philharmonic Orchestra conducted by Pedro Sanjuán Nortes.

Margot made a second trip to New York to receive master classes from leading pianists. After her return, on 16 March 1930 she performed Sergei Rachmaninoff's Piano Concerto No. 2 with the Havana Symphony Orchestra directed by Gonzalo Roig. She was 27 years old. She was persecuted for her progressive opinions, and had to return to Mexico under the "machadato" regime of Gerardo Machado. From 1933 to 1937 she lived in Mexico and performed in the Sala del Conservatorio Nacional in the Palacio de Bellas Artes. She performed in recitals for two pianos with Ernesto Lecuona and Margot de Blanck.

Teacher
After Machado was overthrown Margot returned to Cuba and started to teach as a member of the faculty of the "International Conservatory" that had recently been founded by María Jones de Castro. Soon after she also worked for Hubert de Blanck and in the Colegio Phillips, where she conducted a choir. Teaching provided a stable source of income compared to concert appearances, for which there was limited demand. She made her last public performance in 1957. After the Cuban Revolution of 1959 she was appointed to the Piano Chair at the Amadeo Roldán Conservatory and was asked to teach in the recently created Escuela Nacional de Arte (National School of Art). Margot Rojas died in Havana on 1 November 1996 at the age of 93.

Pupils
Pupils of Margot Rojas include:

Frank Fernández
Carlos Malcolm
Juan Piñera
Jorge Luis Prats
Roberto Urbay
José María Vitier

Notes

Sources

1903 births
1996 deaths
People from Veracruz
Mexican women musicians
Cuban music educators
Mexican pianists
Mexican women pianists
Cuban pianists
Cuban women pianists
20th-century Cuban educators
20th-century Cuban musicians
20th-century pianists
Women music educators
Women classical pianists
20th-century women educators
Mexican emigrants to Cuba
20th-century women pianists